The Strathmore & Perthshire Cricket Union is a regional cricket league in Scotland. Since 1998, it is the feeder league for the North and Midlands of the country into the Scottish National Cricket League until 2011, when the SNCL, after little over a decade of existence, became called the CSL (Cricket Scotland League). Its one of four regional feeder leagues. The Strathmore Union was formed in 1928 and the Perthshire League was formed in 1963. The two merged in 2004.

In the late 1990s the Union had a representative team in the Regional League Championship, which pitted the best players in each league against each other. The SPCU has fielded a representative XI, notably as part of one of its founder members, Arbroath United's 125th anniversary year.

See also
 Cricket in Scotland

References

External links
 Clubsport Strathmore & Perthshire Union 2011, Cricket Scotland

Scottish domestic cricket competitions
Sport in Perth and Kinross